Railroad Guards, Railroad Guard or Railroad Guard Corps may refer to:

Georgia Railroad Guards
Independent State Road Guards
Railroad Guards (Poland) (:pl:Straż Ochrony Kolei)
Train guard